"Red Swan" is a song by Japanese musician Yoshiki, featuring vocals by Hyde. Written and produced by Yoshiki, it is the opening theme song of the first 12 episodes of the third season of the Attack on Titan anime series. The television edit of the song was published on digital platforms on July 23, 2018, while the full single version was released on October 3, 2018.

The single debuted at No. 4 on the Oricon Singles Chart and number 5 on Billboard Japans Hot 100. It also topped the iTunes Rock Chart in 10 countries, making it the best-performing anime song in the chart's history, and reached the top ten on the iTunes mainstream charts in 16 countries. In 2019, the song won Top Japanese Gold Song at the 30th International Pop Poll Awards.

Background and release
On July 8, 2018, it was revealed at Anime Expo in Los Angeles that X Japan had teamed up with Hyde from L'Arc-en-Ciel to create the theme song of the third season of the Attack on Titan anime. "Red Swan" was originally announced as an X Japan song, that would only feature Yoshiki and Sugizo, with Hyde on vocals. However, later that month the song was announced to now be credited to "Yoshiki feat. Hyde".

"Red Swan" was inspired by a section of X Japan's 1994 number-one single "Rusty Nail". Its standard edition cover art was designed with elements from the cover art of "Rusty Nail", namely the blood dripping from a woman's mouth. On September 15, Yoshiki revealed that "Red Swan" was actually completed just days earlier in Los Angeles. Two days later, Yoshiki and Hyde performed the song live on Music Station.

The television edit of the song was published on digital platforms on July 23, 2018, while the full song was released digitally and on CD, in two different versions, on October 3, 2018.

Reception
Michelle Minikhiem of J-Generation called "Red Swan" "grand in the way only songs written by Yoshiki can be," with a vocal performance that "absolutely aches with longing." She described the track and its "swelling percussion, passionately romantic lyrics, and murmured philosophical questioning about life" as telling the story of a bittersweet love.

In 2019, the song won Top Japanese Gold Song at the 30th International Pop Poll Awards in Hong Kong.

Chart performance
"Red Swan" debuted at No. 4 on the Oricon Singles Chart and charted for 19 weeks. It also debuted at No. 3 on the Oricon Digital Singles Chart.

The song debuted at number 5 on Billboard Japans Hot 100. It also reached number 6 on Billboard Japans Top Singles chart, which is based only on physical sales, and topped Billboard Japans Hot Animation chart, which tracks anime and video game music.

The single topped the iTunes Rock charts in Japan, Finland, Greece, Chile, Argentina, Colombia, Mexico, Peru, Brazil and Hong Kong, making it the best-performing anime song in the chart's history. It also reached No. 6 on the US Rock chart and No. 8 on the UK Rock chart. The song reached the top ten on the iTunes mainstream charts in 16 countries.

Track listing

Personnel

 Yoshiki – drums, piano, guitar, bass, synthesizers, production, orchestration
 Hyde – vocals

Special guest appearances
 Sugizo – guitar
 Pata – guitar
 Heath – bass

Production
 Mark Needham – mixing
 Stephen Marcussen – mastering
 Shelly Berg – orchestration
 Daniel Sternbaum – recording engineer
 Ryan Boesch – recording engineer
 Yuji Sugiyama – recording engineer
 Toshi Minesaki – recording engineer
 Hisayuki Watanabe – recording engineer
 Steve Churchyard – orchestra recording
 Brian Fedirko – programming

Charts

Sales

References

External links
 Official website

2018 singles
2018 songs
Anime songs
Attack on Titan
Japanese rock songs
Pony Canyon singles
Songs written by Yoshiki (musician)